Cordyla somalensis is a species of flowering plant in the family Fabaceae. It is found only in Somalia.

References

Near threatened plants
Endemic flora of Somalia
Amburaneae
Taxonomy articles created by Polbot